El Chema is an American crime television series premiered on Telemundo on December 6, 2016, and concluded on April 3, 2017. The series is produced by Argos Comunicación and Telemundo Studios for Telemundo. Starred and produced by Mauricio Ochmann. It is a spin-off of the series El Señor de los Cielos.

The first season consists of 84 episodes, and is available on Netflix as of July 1, 2017.

Synopsis 
The first season tells the story of how Chema Venegas (Mauricio Ochmann) got his start in organized crime and rose through the ranks to become the head of the cartel he runs in "El Señor de los Cielos." El Chema began breaking the law at a young age, transporting marijuana across the US-Mexican border when he was just a boy. Little by little, he worked his way up to become a successful and skillful leader, earning his place through bloodshed and brutality, in the history of drug trafficking. Since he was a young man, El Chema has been one of the most important public enemies of both the U.S and Mexican governments.

Cast

Main 
 Mauricio Ochmann as El Chema
 Mariana Seoane as María Isabel "Mabel" Castaño
 Julio Bracho as Don Ricardo Almenar Paiva
 Sergio Basañez as Don Tobías Clark
 Itatí Cantoral as Doña Blanca

Also main

 Arcelia Ramírez as Doña Elvira Mendivil
 Leonardo Daniel as Don Alfredo "Feyo" Aguilera
 Fernando Noriega as Eutimio "Rojo" Flores
 Alexandra de la Mora as Inés Clark
 Francisco de la O as Gary Roberts
 Carla Carrillo as Amanda Almenar
 Gustavo Egelhaaf as Saúl Clark
 Jorge Luis Vázquez as Fabricio Ponce
 Alberto Casanova as Coronel Israel Centeno
 Guillermo Quintanilla as Don Isidro Robles
 Ari Brickman as Jeremy Andrews
 Pablo Bracho as Don Joaquín Venegas
 Fernando Solórzano as Don Óscar Cadena
 Sebastián Caicedo as El Tostado Yepes / Eleazar Yepes
 Luis Yeverino as Benito Narváez
 Hiromi Hayakawa as Lucy Li
 Julieta Grajales as Regina Campo
 Jorge Cárdenas as Carlos Rodríguez "El Pelusa"
 Pilar Fernández as Martha
 Adrián Rubio as Freddy Torres
 Daniel Rascón as El Toro
 Alexander Holtmann as Leslie Carroll
 Juan Ignacio Aranda as Ramiro Silva de la Garza
 Hector Molina as Morillo Juárez
 Carlos Balderrama as José Manuel Castillo "Manny"
 Pedro Giunti as Agente López
 Iñaki Goci as El Triste
 Mauricio Rousselon as Ernesto
 Adolfo Madera as Agente Trejo
 Dale Carley as Jones

Recurring 
 Karla Carrillo as Salma Vidal
 Luis Gerónimo Abreu as Nelson Martínez "El Veneco"

Special guest stars 
 Rodrigo Abed as César Silva de la Garza
 Bianca Calderón as Roxana Mondragón
 Marco Pérez as Guadalupe Robles
 Anai Urrego as Lorelay "Lay" Cadena
 Carmen Aub as Rutila Casillas
 Carlos Puente as Pompeyo
 Rafael Amaya as Aurelio Casillas
 Jesús Moré as Omar Terán
 Lambda García as Nerio Pereira
 Isela Vega as Celia
 Luisa Huertas as Nelly
 Plutarco Haza as Dalvio Navarrete / El Ingeniero
 Jorge Luis Moreno as Víctor Casillas Jr.
 Lorena del Castillo as Oficial Evelyn García
 Iván Tamayo as Jorge Elías Salazar
 Vanessa Villela as Emiliana Contreras
 Juan Ríos Cantú as General Daniel Jimenez Arroyo / El Letrudo
 Javier Díaz Dueñas as Don Anacleto "Cleto" Letrán
 Claudia La Gatta as Alina Martínez
 Fernanda Castillo as Mónica Robles
 Wendy de los Cobos as Aguasanta "Tata" Guerra
 Iván Arana as Ismael Casillas Guerra
 Alejandro López as El Super Javi
 Rossana Nájera as Auristela Durán
 Scarlet Gruber as Young Blanca
 Alejandro Speitzer as Young Ricardo Almenar Paiva

Production 
The original series is based on the fictional character and is not related to the life of Chapo Guzmán.

Telemundo confirmed on May 15, 2016 that the series would see a spinoff based upon actor Mauricio Ochmann's character 'El Chema'. On September 21, 2016, Telemundo confirmed that production officially started. Telemundo would release exclusive web videos on November 15, 2016 explaining the title character's backstory including tying in the title character's last appearance in El Señor de los Cielos to the start of the events of the spinoff.

Actress and music artist Mariana Seoane also participates in the series as "Mabel", and composed songs for the series. Itatí Cantoral also confirmed her participation in the series as a villain, Cantoral and Seoane are more recognized for work for Televisa.

Rating

Episodes

Awards and nominations

References

External links
 

Spanish-language American telenovelas
Telemundo telenovelas
2016 telenovelas
2016 American television series debuts
Argos Comunicación telenovelas
American telenovelas
Mexican telenovelas
2016 Mexican television series debuts
2017 American television series endings
2017 Mexican television series endings
Works about Mexican drug cartels